The Indonesian Air Force sometimes shortened as IDAF / IdAF, is the aerial branch of the Indonesian National Armed Forces. The Indonesian Air Force is headquartered in Jakarta, Indonesia and is headed by the Chief of Staff of the Air Force ( – KSAU or KASAU). Its order of battle is split into three Air Operations Commands. Most of its airbases are located on the island of Java. The Indonesian Air Force also has its ground force unit, called Air Force Quick Reaction Force Command (Kopasgat). The corps is also known as the "Orange Berets" due to the distinctive color of their service headgear.

The Indonesian Air Force has 37,850 personnel and equipped with 110 combat aircraft. The inventory includes five Su-27 and eleven Su-30 as the main fighters (from Russia) supplemented by 33 F-16 Fighting Falcons (from the United States), Hawk 200, KAI T-50 and Embraer EMB314. The Indonesian Air Force intends to purchase 50 KF-X as a replacement for the already-aging US Northrop F-5 Tiger light fighters in its inventory In February 2021, Indonesian Air Force intends to purchase 36 Rafale and 8 F-15EX, along with C-130J and Medium-altitude long-endurance unmanned aerial vehicle. By February 2022, Indonesian Air Force orders for 42 Rafale has been signed and a possible Foreign Military Sales of 36 F-15ID has been published by the DSCA.

History

Indonesian War of Independence / Netherlands 'Police Action' (1945–1949)

After the Japanese announced their surrender at the end of WWII, Indonesian nationalist leader Sukarno declared Indonesian Independence on 17 August 1945. Several days later, the Indonesian People's Security Bureau (Badan Keamanan Rakyat) was formed to undertake security duties. The Air Division of this force was also formed, using ex-Japanese planes scattered everywhere, especially in the island of Java, including Bugis Air Base in Malang (Established on 18 September 1945). The most numerous of these aeroplanes were the Yokosuka K5Y1 Willow (Cureng) trainers, which were hastily used to train newly recruited cadets. At the time of the founding, there was only one Indonesian holding a multi-engine pilot license from the pre-war Dutch Flying School, Flying Officer Agustinus Adisucipto (but did not have an opportunity to fly during the 3.5-year Japanese occupation). He was assisted by a few Japanese pilots who decided to stay in the newly born country. The new roundel was created simply by painting white on the lower part of the Japanese Hinomaru, reflecting the red and white of the Indonesian flag.  The People's Security Bureau was then, in October, re-organized to form the nascent formal armed forces. This marked the birth of the Indonesian Air Force on 9 April 1946. However, tensions rose as the Dutch tried to re-claim their former colony and launched an assault on 21 July 1947, destroying most of the planes on the ground. Some planes survived though and were hidden in remote bases.

29 July 1947 was date of the first air operation by the newborn air force as three surviving aircraft, comprising two Yokosuka K5Y1 Willow (Cureng) and a Mitsubishi Ki-51 Sonia (the fourth aircraft, a Nakajima Ki-43 Oscar (Hayabusa) flown by Air Cadet Bambang Saptoadji, should also have been involved in the raid as an escort, but as of when it was launched, the aircraft was not airworthy due to engine troubles) conducted air raids at dawn on the Dutch Army barracks in Semarang, Salatiga and Ambarawa, dropping incendiary bombs. Tactically, these raids did not have any effect on the Dutch positions, but psychologically, it was a great success as it proved that the Indonesian Air Force still existed. The Dutch had previously claimed the destruction of Indonesian Air Force in their assault before and they never expected any attack from the sky. Dutch Curtiss P-40E Warhawks tried to find all the guerrillas' planes, but they were too late to find those "ghost" aircraft which landed quickly in Maguwo Air Base, near Yogyakarta (now, Adisucipto International Airport).  Indonesian pro-independence guerrillas tried to save captured aircraft in a number of remote areas, including examples of the Mitsubishi A6M Zero-Sen "Zeke", Aichi D3A "Val", and Mitsubishi G4M "Betty".

Under pressure from the United Nations, the Dutch finally agreed to acknowledge Indonesian independence. Following the 1949 Round Table Conference, sovereignty was officially transferred to the United States of Indonesia. The Dutch armed forces left (but remained in West Papua until 1963) and the aeroplanes were handed over to the Indonesians. These comprised, among others, North American P-51 Mustang, North American B-25 Mitchell, North American T-6 Texan, Douglas A-26 Invader, Douglas C-47 Dakota and Consolidated PBY-5A Catalina, which served as the main forces of the Indonesian Air Force for the following decade. During this era, Indonesia received its first jet aircraft; De Havilland DH-115 Vampire. It was also during this era that the national roundels were changed to the red and white pentagon (which was supposed to signify Indonesia's national ideology of "Panca Sila", or the "Five Principles", created by Sukarno in 1945).

Action against rebellions (1950–1961)

Political instability meant that the Indonesian Air Force saw action against several regional rebellions in Indonesia such as PRRI, Permesta, Darul Islam-Tentara Islam Indonesia (DI/TII) and the Republic of South Maluku separatists.

Several Indonesian pilots scored their first kills, including Captain Ignatius Dewanto with his North American P-51 Mustang, who in 1958 shot down a Permesta Douglas B-26 Invader over Ambon. Its pilot, Allen Pope, an American CIA agent, was captured and tried in Jakarta, thus revealing the significant involvement of the CIA's "Operation Haik" in the rebellion.

The most famous Indonesian fighter pilot in this era was Rusmin Nurjadin, who became Chief of Staff of the Air Force from 1966 to 1969. Nurjadin commanded MiG-21 squadrons in 1962–65 and founded an acrobatic team in 1962 that flew the MiG-17F/PF Fresco over some cities in Indonesia. Small numbers of Indonesian Air Force pilots gained their reputation as aces in this era.

Soviet influence (1962–1965)

The need to prop up to what became Operation Trikora in Netherlands New Guinea and the rise of the Communist Party of Indonesia drew Indonesia closer to the Eastern Bloc. Several Soviet-built aircraft began to arrive in the early 1960s including the MiG-15UTI from Czechoslovakia, MiG-17F/PF, MiG-19S and MiG-21F-13, in addition to Ilyushin Il-28, Mil Mi-4, Mil Mi-6, Antonov An-12 and Avia 14 also from Czechoslovakia. Indonesia also received Lavochkin La-11, as well as Tupolev Tu-2 from China, intended to replace the B-25, but they never reached operational status. These aircraft served along with the remaining American aircraft such as North American B-25 Mitchell, Douglas A-26 Invader, Douglas C-47 Dakota and North American P-51 Mustang. It was during this period that the Indonesian Air Force became the first Air Force in Southeast Asia which acquired the capability of strategic bombing by acquiring the new Tupolev Tu-16 in 1961, before the acquisition of Ilyushin Il-28 by Vietnam People's Air Force. Around 25 Tu-16KS were delivered complete with AS-1 air-surface missiles. One crashed at the end of 1962. To add with all these purchases was the first ever surface to air air defense missile operated by Southeast Asians, the S-75 Dvina, which were acquired in 1961.

This era also marked the last confrontation with the Dutch in Papua, before the Dutch, again under pressure of the United Nations, left in 1963. Several missions of Taiwan-based Lockheed U-2s from 35th Squadron flew over Maluku (Moluccas) and reported to Dutch military that there was a strong possibility that the Dutch would lose their air superiority over Papua if they continued the war. During Operation Trikora, the air force was deployed as follows:

7 P-51Ds based at Laha airbase, Ambon. One aircraft piloted by Second Lieutenant (AF) Prasetyo lost due to engine failure during the ferry flight from Makassar to Ambon. Prasetyo died after bailing out from the aircraft, landing in high-tide seas and could not be rescued by the Air Force's PBY-5 Catalina due to the extreme weather after his accident.
40 MiG-17F/PF aircraft on three airfields: Morotai (in northern Maluku), Amahai (in Seram) and Letfuan (in Kai Islands, located in the southwest of Papua). The aircraft had been stationed at Morotai before Operation Trikora for actions against PRRI-Permesta and the Republic of South Maluku separatists. The primary role of these aircraft were to provide air cover for the airlift and logistics aircraft during the early infiltration to Papua. If the war broke out, these MiG-17F/PF would provide the air cover for Tu-16 anti-shipping missions and Il-28 bombing missions, also for intercepting Dutch Hawker Hunters based in Numfor, Biak.

4 B-25 Mitchells and two A-26 Invaders at Letfuan airbase. Their primary role was for transport and providing air cover for the airlift, until this role was assumed by the P-51Ds and MiG-17F/PFs. Dutch Lockheed P2V Neptunes were known as the strongest rival for these Letfuan-based units.
18 Il-28s stationed first at Laha airbase, but then moved to Amahai airbase, due to the shortness of runway at Laha for the landing of the aircraft.
 26 Tu-16s stationed in Iswahyudi Air Force Base near Ngawi, East Java in 41st and 42nd Squadron. Six aircraft were scrambled to Morotai airbase for the operation. These units were to threaten the Dutch naval fleet in Papua including HNLMS Karel Doorman (R81), the only aircraft carrier of the Dutch naval fleet.
24 Douglas C-47 Dakotas stationed at three airfields; Laha, Amahai and Letfuan. During an operation at Papua, one aircraft piloted by Captain (AF) Djalaludin Tantu and co-pilot Second Lieutenant (AF) Sukandar, was downed by a Dutch P2V. All crews bailed out safely from the aircraft, but were then captured by the Dutch forces.
10 Lockheed C-130 Hercules stationed at Halim Perdanakusuma airbase at Jakarta. Despite the warning from United States to not use the aircraft for the operation, it soon scrambled over the Papua for the airlift mission, due to the loss of C-47s, to Dutch Hawker Hunters and P2V Neptunes. The C-130's high altitude flying capability made it less vulnerable to interception.
6 Douglas DC-3s and one Convair 240, under Wing Garuda 011. The aircraft were modified from civilian use for airlift operations.
6 anti-submarine Fairey Gannet AS.4s, several PBY-5 Catalinas and two Grumman HU-16 Albatross (UF-1 variant). These aircraft belonged to the Indonesian Naval Aviation, but supporting the air forces for the Operation. Aircraft were stationed in Liang airbase at Seram, then moved to Morotai airbase. One Gannet AS.4 was lost due to an accident when it crashed into a mountain in Seram island, killing three crew members.
Several Bell 47s, Mil Mi-4 and Mil Mi-6 helicopters were planned to be used for the operation, but were not ready during the early phase of infiltration of the operation.

Indonesian MiG pilots received training to fly their fighter aircraft in Egypt before the infiltration campaign. During the infiltration of the airlift campaign, the air forces' special forces,  (PGT) (now known as Kopasgat) landed in Klamono-Sorong, Papua.

Also during this period, the Indonesian Air Force also took part in the confrontation against Malaysia (which was backed by the United Kingdom) along the border of Kalimantan, the Malacca Strait and near the Singapore maritime border, wherein Air Force aircraft faced their counterparts in the Royal Air Force and the young Royal Malaysian Air Force.

30 September movement and the overthrow of Sukarno (1966–1970)

The coup attempt led by the 30 September Movement in 1965 changed everything and a new anti-communist regime from the Army, led by Major General Suharto, took power. The Chief of Staff of the Air Force, Air Marshall Omar Dani was removed from his position and court-martialed for his purported involvement in the coup.  Ties with the Eastern bloc countries were cut, and thus support and spare parts for the planes became short. By August 1968 the situation was critical, and in early 1970, the Chief of Staff of the Air Force, Suwoto Sukandar, said that the spare parts situation meant that only 15–20 percent of aircraft were airworthy. The MiG force made its farewell flight with a flypast of Jakarta in 1970. The relatively new MiG-19s were sold to Pakistan. By October 1970, only one Tu-16 was still flying, but after an in-flight engine failure, it too was grounded. But despite the problems, the Air Force still served with distinction in fighting militant remnants of the CPI in Java's provinces, particularly in Central and East Java.

With Suharto's assumption of the presidency and the office of Commander in Chief in 1967, the focus shifted to fighting the communist PGRS/Paraku insurgency. The Air Force launched Operation Lightning Strike to support ground troops eradicate Sarawak communists that were present in West Kalimantan and along Indonesia-Malaysia border by dropping troops to the target area, dropping logistical assistance, VIP transportation, medical evacuation and recon flights. The Air Force deployed Air Squadron 6 and 7 which were equipped with Mi-4, Bell 204B and UH-34D helicopters to the operation.

Rebirth (1970–1980)

The Air Force began to be re-equipped by receiving former Royal Australian Air Force (RAAF) CAC Sabres – an Australian re-design of the F-86 Sabre – to replace the MiG-21s. The Sabre was used by the TNI-AU until 1982. In 1973, the United States supplied military assistance including T33s trainers and UH-34D helicopters in exchange for four old MiG-21F-13s. Pakistan Air Force took over the responsibility to train Indonesian pilots in the Sabre and in logistical aspects of the Air Force. Over the next three years, the US supplied 16 North American Rockwell OV-10 Broncos counter-insurgency aircraft and F-5E/F Tiger II fighters, in exchange for which the Indonesian Air Force handed over the majority of its remaining MiG-21F-13s, which were used to form a US Air Force Aggressor squadron. Indonesia also purchased BAE Hawk Mk 53s from the United Kingdom in the 1970s.

The Indonesian Air Force took part in the 1975 Indonesian invasion of East Timor.

Influence of American and allied products (1980–1998)

In the early 1980s, the Air Force, needing modern strike aircraft, organised Operation Alpha to clandestinely acquire ex-Israeli Air Force A-4 Skyhawks. Air Force personnel were sent in secret by different routes and eventually Indonesia received 32 aircraft.

In 1982, Indonesia purchased 16 Northrop F-5E/F Tiger II from the United States to replace their Sabres under the Peace Komodo I and II. These were upgraded in Belgium from 1995.

During 1986–88, there was a competition for the contract to provide a new fighter bomber, between the General Dynamics F-16 and Dassault Mirage 2000. Indonesia eventually ordered 12 F-16A/B Fighting Falcon Block 15 OCU as a new fighter in 1989. The Indonesian Air Force had originally planned to acquire 60 F-16s to cover and defend its 12 million square kilometres of territory. A total of 10 F-16A and F-16B are still in service with Indonesian Air Force: 2 planes crashed in two different accidents. A follow-up order for 9 more F-16A Block-15 OCU was cancelled in favour of 24 Su-30KI, but this order was also cancelled due to the 1997 Asian Financial Crisis.

The Indonesian Air Force ordered eight BAE Hawk Mk 109s and 32 Mk 209s in 1993. The last of these was delivered by January 1997.

1998–2006 embargoes

In 1999, the Indonesian military staged a military intervention in East Timor following an independence referendum. The result was that more than 1,500 civilians were killed and 70 percent of Dili's infrastructure razed. In response, the United States and the European Union both imposed arms embargoes. Although the European Union chose not to renew its ban in 2000, the United States did not lift its embargo until November 2005. During this embargo, the Indonesian government turned to Russia to supply them with arms including fighters, helicopters, missiles, radars and other equipment.

In 2002, the Indonesian Air Force conducted operations against separatists, such as the Free Aceh Movement (Gerakan Aceh Merdeka (GAM)) and Free Papua Movement (Organisasi Papua Merdeka (OPM)). In the conflict with GAM in Aceh, the Indonesian Air Force utilised OV-10Fs for counter-insurgency actions along with BAe Hawk 53 and 209.

In that same year, the Air Force received two Sukhoi Su-27s and two Sukhoi Su-30s from Russia. The fighters were partly paid for in Indonesian palm oil. The purchase, however, did not include any weaponry. Seven KT-1B Korean basic trainers were also purchased.

By 2005 the Air Force was experiencing a logistical crisis. The F-16s and A-4s, which accounted for 80% of its air combat assets, were at the minimum or nil level of combat readiness. To respond to the crisis, in 2006, the Indonesian Air Force ordered three Sukhoi Su-27SKM and three Su-30MK2 to complete a full squadron. It was also made public that the four aircraft procured in 2003 were inactive and awaiting an upgrade of their communication systems, as they were incompatible with the Indonesian systems in use. The additional aircraft were ordered with systems complying with the Indonesian and international standards and would also include new weaponry for all variants. A further 12 KT-1b trainers were also ordered in 2006.

Until 2008, the Indonesian Air Force had only purchased four types of missiles: KS-1 Komet, Vympel K-13, AIM-9 Sidewinder and AGM-65 Maverick. Starting from 2008, it started receiving more advanced Russian made Vympel R-73 and R-77 air-to-air missiles for its new Su-27 and Su-30 fighters. Also, a limited number of Kh-29, Kh-31 and Kh-59 air-to-ground missiles were delivered for the Su-30s.

Local weapons are being developed such as P-100 air-to-ground bomb manufactured by PT Dahana and PT Sari Bahari Malang, East Java. P-100 has been successfully tested in Su-27 and Su-30 for ground attack missions. Large-scale production has received certification from Ministry of Defence.

Minimum Essential Force (MEF) 2010–present

During the visit of US President Barack Obama on 9–10 November 2010, the TNI-AU was offered 24 ex-USAF F-16 Block 25 aircraft as part of the Peace Bima-Sena II agreement. In October 2011, the House of Representatives approved the grant. The jets will be upgraded similar to the latest Block 50/52 variant with payment. The TNI-AU is also progressing with the reactivation of all 10 units of F-16 Block 15 OCU, which resulted in the reactivation of TS-1606, TS-1609 and TS-1612 recently. To replace the Fokker F-27s, the TNI-AU has ordered nine Spanish CASA C-295 in joint production with PT. Dirgantara Indonesia. New unmanned aerial vehicles will also be purchased to strengthen TNI-AU aerial observation and will be based at Supadio Air Force Base, Pontianak, Kalimantan Barat.

Starting in 2010, Minister of Defence Purnomo Yusgiantoro stated that TNI-AU will gradually purchase a total of 180 Su-27s and Su-30s to complete the needs of 10 squadrons. India also offered TNI-AU Indian-Russian made BrahMos missiles to equip its Su-27s and Su-30s.

Indonesia signed a memorandum of understanding to participate in the South Korean KF-X programme in July 2010 and the terms of agreement was signed in 2011. Indonesia will finance 20 percent of the project and will receive 50 jets in return, while South Korea will get 200 jets. A Defence ministry spokesman claimed that the jet would be more capable than the F-16 but less capable that the F-35. The project was started in 2009 and the first prototype is expected to roll out in the second half of 2020. But payment problems and technical difficulties had caused several delays and postponement of the KAI KF-X project. Indonesia has also signed an MOU with China to produce C-705 missiles which will arm the Sukhoi jets.

In April 2011, Indonesia confirmed that it will buy 16 supersonic KAI T-50 Golden Eagle trainer jets from South Korea for up to $400 million after an evaluation of the Yakovlev Yak-130, Guizhou JL-9/FTC-2000  Mountain Eagle and Aero L-159 Alca. The T-50 would replace the BAE Hawk MK-53 trainer jets. Deliveries were completed by January 2014 and were commissioned on 13 February 2014.

In June 2011, Indonesia signed the final contract for 8 Super Tucano as the replacement for the OV-10 Bronco in the counter-insurgency role
 with a second contract for a further 8 aircraft in July 2012. The first four units arrived in March 2012 with deliveries to complete by 2014.

In August 2011, Indonesia announced that it would acquire 18 Grob G120TP for its basic trainer requirements which would likely replace the FFA AS-202 Bravo and Beechcraft T-34 Mentor trainers.

On 29 December 2011 Indonesia committed to purchase 6 Su-30MK2 jet fighters in a $470 million procurement contract signed by the Defence Ministry and Russia's JSC Rosoboronexport. Deliveries will reportedly start after 2013.

In January 2012, the Australian and Indonesian governments agreed to the transfer of four used C-130H Hercules aircraft from the Royal Australian Air Force to the Indonesian Air Force in 2012, which was approved by the US as the Hercules' producer.

In January 2014, Defence Minister Purnomo Yusgiantoro said that he hoped to start the replacement of the F-5 fighters under the upcoming 2015 to 2020 strategic plan. The Indonesian Air Force shortlisted five candidates for the replacement, comprising the Sukhoi Su-35S, Saab JAS 39 Gripen, Dassault Rafale, Eurofighter Typhoon, and F-16C/D Block 60.

In September 2014, Head of Indonesian National Armed Forces Public Relations and Media Office (Kapuspen TNI), Major General (TNI) Mochamad Fuad Basya explained the Minimum Essential Forces (MEF) Plan of TNI-AU consist of: 11 Fighter Squadrons, 6 Transport Squadrons, 2 VIP/VVIP Squadrons, 2 Patrol Squadrons, 4 Helicopter Squadrons, 2 Training Squadrons and 2 UAV Squadrons.

In September 2015, Defence Minister Ryamizard Ryacudu said Indonesian had chosen the Su-35 Flanker-E to replace the F-5 Tiger II. Although in recent times, the deal to purchase Su-35 is in limbo due to Russia's refusal to give transfer of technology to Indonesia owing its small number of orders in addition to Indonesian concerns over price.

In January 2017, Indonesia approved for the acquisition of 5 Airbus A400M Atlas multi-role aircraft worth US$2 billion, as part of the plans to boost the country's military capabilities. They are to be acquired in both transport and utility configurations and will be operated by the Indonesian Air Force (TNI-AU) Aviation Squadrons 31 and 32. In November 2021, Indonesian ministry of defence officially orders two Airbus A400M in multirole tanker and transport configuration.

On 12 May 2017, Defence Minister Ryamizard Ryacudu confirm that Indonesian Air Force (TNI-AU) will sign contract to buy 10 units Su-35. Russia will open the factory for Sukhoi Spare Part in Indonesia as part in the contract.

On 28 November 2017, Defence Minister Ryamizard Ryacudu confirm that Indonesian Air Force (TNI-AU) have completed procurement process of 11 units Su-35.

On 14 February 2018, Defence Ministry have signed purchase agreement of 11 units of Su-35 fighters with Rostec, which will replace the F-5s.

In October 2019 the Chief of Staff of the Indonesian Air Force Yuyu Sutisna said the Indonesian Air Force will purchase at least 2 Squadrons (32 aircraft) of F-16V Block 70/72 for the last phase of the 'Minimum Essential Force' program (MEF Fase 3 2020–2024). Possibly to replace the older BAE Systems Hawk. Since 2017 the Indonesian Air Force with Lockheed Martin and Indonesian Aerospace is also upgrading their existing F-16A/B with the Falcon STAR eMLU upgrade program that include new avionics, new armament capability that could carry AMRAAM, and JDAM, new aircraft airframe that will last longer, Sniper ATP, LITENING, and Bird Slicer IFF. The upgrade is being carried out by Indonesian companies supervised by Lockheed Martin in Skadron Teknik 042.

In January 2020 the Indonesian Minister of Defence Prabowo Subianto during a bilateral meeting in France and met with his French counterpart Florence Parly, it was reported that the Ministry is interested on French military equipments including 48 Dassault Rafales, four Scorpène submarines and two Gowind corvettes.

On 12 March 2020 Bloomberg reported that Indonesia cancelled the Su-35 deal due to the US pressure. Indonesia is instead looking to negotiate the purchase of F-35 aircraft. This was later denied and Russia ensured that the cooperation would continue, although there were still a number of things to discuss. On 8 July 2020 Russian Ambassador to Indonesia, Lyudmila Vorobieva stated that Indonesia's plan to buy 11 Sukhoi Su-35 fighter jets from Russia is still continuing.

On 20 July 2020, a letter written by defense minister, Prabowo Subianto to his Austrian counterpart Klaudia Tanner, was published by Indonesian news outlets expressing interest in acquiring Austria's Luftstreitkräfte entire fleet of Eurofighter Typhoon jets.

On 18 February 2021, the Chief of Staff of the Air Force Air Chief Marshal Fadjar Prasetyo announces in annual Air Force Leadership Meeting that Indonesian Air Force plans to buy 36 Dassault Rafales and 8 F-15EX Strike Eagle, of which 6 F-15EX are expected to arrive in 2022, along with C-130J Super Hercules and Medium-altitude long-endurance unmanned aerial vehicle. The Air Chief Marshal also stated that the Air Force will modernize its various fleet of combat aircraft, whose implementation will begin in 2021.

In November 2021, Airbus confirmed that the Indonesian Ministry of Defense had signed a deal with Airbus for 2 A400Ms configured for MRTT role, with an option, in the form of a letter of intent, for four additional aircraft.

On 22 December 2021 during a Press Tour and Media Gathering, Fadjar Prasetyo has confirmed that the Su-35 purchase will not go ahead. Regarding the planned purchase of the Sukhoi Su-35, Fadjar said it would be abandoned.It has ambitious plans for a home made future 4.5 generation jet fighter with South Korea's KAI and Indonesia IAe, the KF-X/IF-X. On November 11, 2021, it was reported that South Korea and Indonesia had reached an agreement on the payment Indonesia would have to make for their joint fighter jet project after concerns that Jakarta would default on the deal. Under the renegotiated agreement, Indonesia will have to pay 1.6 trillion won ($1.35 billion) of the 8.1 trillion-won project.

On 10 February 2022, Dassault Aviation stated that Indonesia has officially signed an order for 42 Dassault Rafale F4s, concluding two years of negotiations with 6 aircraft for Batch I. Hours later the State Department of the United States approved Indonesia to purchase up to 36 F-15ID aircraft, the would-be Indonesian variant of the F-15EX.
 
On 20 April 2022, PT Len Industri and Thales Group signed a strategic partnership agreement for further collaboration on a wide array of defence-related topics including radars, military satellites, electronic warfare, UAVs and combat management systems. 

On 17 May 2022, PT Len Industri signed an agreement with Thales Group to jointly produce 13 GCI radars. Thales will be partnering with state-owned defence electronics firm PT Len Industri to supply Ground Master 403 (GM403) air surveillance radars and SkyView command-and-control (C2) system to Indonesia.

Indonesia has considered in acquiring 12 used Mirage 2000-5s from Qatar for the Indonesian Air Force. In November 2022, the Ministry of Finance of Indonesia has approved foreign loans to fund several Indonesian Air Force procurement programs, including the ex-Qatari Mirage 2000s proposal.

Administrative and operational organisation 
The Indonesian Air Force is structured into the following in accordance with Presidential decree No. 66/ 2019:

Leadership Elements 
 Chief of Staff of the Air Force, position held by a four-star air marshal.
 Vice Chief of Staff of the Air Force, position held by a three-star air marshal.

Assistant for Leadership Element 
 Office of the Inspector General of the Air Force, position held by a two-star air marshal.
 Air Force Chief of Staff Advisor, position held by two-star or one-star air marshal
 Air Force Planning and Budgeting Advisor
 Air Force Intelligence Advisor
 Air Force Operations Advisor
 Air Force Human Resources Advisor
 Air Force Supply Advisor
 Air Potency and Resources Advisor
 Air Force Communications and Electronics Advisor

Central Executive Agencies under Air Force Headquarters 

 Air Force Airworthiness, Aviation Safety and Occupational Center (Pusat Kelaikan, Keselamatan Terbang dan Kerja TNI Angkatan Udara (PUSLAIKLAMBANGJAAU))
 Air Force Military Police Center (Pusat Polisi Militer TNI Angkatan Udara /PUSPOMAU), POMAU also serve as Air Base Security Force and operate K9 brigade
 Air Force Materiel Supply Center (Pusat Pembekalan Materiel TNI Angkatan Udara)
 Air Force Aerospace Potential Center (Pusat Potensi Kedirgantaraan (PUSPOTDIRGA))
 Air Force Finance Department (Dinas Keuangan TNI Angkatan Udara (DISKUAU))
 Air Force Information and Data Processing Department (Dinas Informasi dan Pengolahan Data TNI Angkatan Udara (DISINFOLAHTAAU))
 Air Force Research and Development Department (Dinas Penelitian dan Pengembangan TNI Angkatan Udara (DISLITBANGAU))
 Air Force Signals and Security Department (Dinas Pengamanan dan Sandi TNI Angkatan Udara (DISPAMSANAU))
 Air Force Aerial Survey and Photography Department (Dinas Survei dan Pemotretan Udara TNI Angkatan Udara (DISSURPOTRUDAU))
  Air Force Public Relations and Media Department (Dinas Penerangan TNI Angkatan Udara (DISPENAU))
 Air Force Operational Development Department (Dinas Pengembangan Operasi TNI Angkatan Udara (DISBANGOPSAU))
 Air Force Justice Department (Dinas Hukum TNI Angkatan Udara (DISKUMAU))
 Air Force Personnel Administration Department (Dinas Administrasi Personel TNI Angkatan Udara (DISMINPERSAU))
 Air Force Education Department (Dinas Pendidikan TNI Angkatan Udara (DISDIKAU))
 Air Force Personnel Maintenance Department (Dinas Perawatan Personel TNI Angkatan Udara(DISWATPERSAU))
 Air Force Medical Department (Dinas Kesehatan TNI Angkatan Udara (DISKESAU))
 Air Force Psychology Department (Dinas Psikologi TNI Angkatan Udara (DISPSIAU))
 Air Force Materiel Department (Dinas Materiil TNI Angkatan Udara (DISMATAU))
 Air Force Aeronautics Department (Dinas Aeronautika TNI Angkatan Udara (DISAEROAU)) 
 Air Force Communications and Electronics Department (Dinas Komunikasi dan Elektronika TNI Angkatan Udara (DISKOMLEKAU))
 Air Force Construction Deparment (Dinas Konstruksi TNI Angkatan Udara (DISFASKONAU))
 Air Force Fixed Assets Department (Dinas Barang Tidak Bergerak TNI Angkatan Udara (DISBTBAU))
 Air Force Procurement Department (Dinas Pengadaan TNI Angkatan Udara (DISADAAU))
 Air Force Operations and Training Department ( Dinas Operasi dan Latihan TNI Angkatan Udara (DISOPSLATAU))
 Air Force Chaplaincy Department (Dinas Pembinaan Mental dan Ideologi TNI Angkatan Udara)
 Air Force Space and Aviation Medicine Agency "Saryanto" ( Lembaga Kesehatan Penerbangan dan Ruang Angkasa "Saryanto" (LAKESPRA"Saryanto"))

Principal Commands 

  National Air Operations Command (Komando Operasi Udara Nasional (Koopsudnas)), in Jl. Mustang 5 Halim Perdanakusuma Air Base, Jakarta Timur.
  Indonesian Air Force Doctrine, Education and Training Development Command (Komando Pembinaan Doktrin, Pendidikan dan Latihan TNI Angkatan Udara (Kodiklat TNI-AU))
 Flight Education Wing (Wing Pendidikan Terbang (Wingdikterbang)), in Adisutjipto Air Base, Yogyakarta
 General Education Wing (Wing Pendidikan Umum (Wingdikum)), in Halim Perdanakusuma Air Base, Jakarta and Atang Senjaya Air Base, Bogor
 Technical, Supply and Ordnance Education Wing (Wing Pendidikan Teknik dan Pembekalan (Wingdiktekkal)) in Suryadarma Air Base, Subang and Husein Sastranegara Air Force Base, Bandung
  Air Force Material Maintenance Command (Komando Pemeliharaan Materiil TNI Angkatan Udara)
  Air Force Depot Maintenance 10 in Husein Sastranegara Air Base, Bandung
  Air Force Depot Maintenance 20 in Iswahyudi Air Base, Madiun
  Air Force Depot Maintenance 30 in Abdul Rachman Saleh Air Base, Malang
  Air Force Depot Maintenance 40 in Sulaiman Airbase (id), Bandung
  Air Force Depot Maintenance 50 in Adi Soemarmo Air Base, Surakarta
  Air Force Depot Maintenance 60 in Iswahyudi Air Base, Madiun
  Air Force Depot Maintenance 70 in Sulaiman Airbase (id), Bandung
  Air Force Depot Maintenance 80 in Iswahyudi Air Base, Madiun
  Indonesian Air Force Academy (Akademi TNI Angkatan Udara (AAU)) 
  Air Force Command and Staff College ( Sekolah Staf dan Komando TNI Angkatan Udara (Seskoau))

Speciality Corps
Pilot Corps (Korps Penerbang, abbrv: (PNB)), such as Fighter Pilot, Transport Pilot, and Helicopter Pilot, all officers only.
Navigator Corps (Korps Navigator, abbrv: (NAV)), all officers only.
Aviation Engineering Corps (Korps Teknik, abbrv: (TEK)), such as Aircraft Engineer, Armaments Engineer and General Construction Engineering.
Electronics Corps (Korps Elektronika, abbrv: (LEK)), This corps is in charge of Avionics, RADAR, Communication and Air Traffic Control
Administration Corps (Korps Administrasi, abbrv: (ADM)), includes : Personnel Administration, Secretariat Administration and Finance Administration.
Supply Corps (Korps Perbekalan, abbrv: (KAL))
 Air Force Military Police Corps (Korps Polisi Militer Angkatan Udara / POMAU, abbrv: (POM)), all personnel wear light blue berets or MP helmets.
Medical Service Corps of the Air Force (Korps Kesehatan, abbrv: (KES)), includes: Medical Corps, Psychology and Physical Fitness and Sports Service Bureau.
Special Corps (Korps Dinas Khusus, abbrv: (SUS)), consist of Intelligence, Judge Advocate General's Corps, Military Band Service of the Air Force, Information and Communications Technology, Facility and Instrument, Electronic Data Processing, Foreign Language and Meteorology. 
 Quick Reaction Force Command (Komando Pasukan Gerak Cepat, abbrv: (PAS)), air force infantry and special forces corps, wears orange beret.
Air Force Women's Service Corps (Wanita Angkatan Udara, abbrv: (WARA)) - all personnel wear crusher caps save military policewomen who wear as specified above.

Air Bases and Squadrons

 Indonesian Air Force air bases consist of three types (A/B/C) and placed under  National Air Operations Command as follows:

  1st Air Operations Command, consist of 5 type A Air Force Bases, 8 type B Air Force Bases, and 7 type C Air Force Bases.
  2nd Air Operations Command, consist of 5 type A Air Force Bases, 5 type B Air Force Bases, and 2 type C Air Force Bases.
  3rd Air Operations Command, consist of 3 type A Air Force Bases, 2 type B Air Force Bases, and 3 type C Air Force Bases.

Equipment of the Air Force

Chief of Staff of the Air Force

Rank structure

In the Air Force, as well as in other armed forces branches in Indonesia, the rank consists of officer known as in Indonesian: "Perwira", NCO "Bintara" and enlisted "Tamtama".

The proper title to address of rank on official document are as follows, all high-ranking officers (Marshal) use their rank followed by "(TNI)", while other officers use their rank followed by respective branch/corps abbreviation. For example, an Air Force colonel from Flying Corps use the title "Kolonel (PNB)", while an Air Force Marshal from Flying Corps use the title "Marsekal (TNI)". Enlisted airmen are not required to put their respective branch/corps specialty.

Note: Indonesia is not a member of NATO, so there is not an official equivalence between the Indonesian military ranks and those defined by NATO. The displayed parallel is approximate and for illustration purposes only.

Officers

Enlisted personnel

Notable incidents
 A MiG-17 F-1112 strafed several strategic locations in Jakarta and Bogor on 9 March 1960. The fighter aircraft then crash landed in a paddy field in Garut. The aircraft was piloted by Lt. Daniel Maukar (id), an Air Force pilot affiliated with Permesta. He was tasked to strafe BPM fuel tanks at Tanjung Priok harbor, before attempting to assassinate President Sukarno by strafing Merdeka Palace and Bogor Palace.
 A Lockheed L-100-30 Hercules A-1322 crashed on 20 November 1985, killing all 10 crew on board. The aircraft crashed into Mount Sibayak. The aircraft was conducting routine air patrol over Sumatra.
 A Lockheed C-130 Hercules A-1324 crashed in Jakarta on 5 October 1991, killing 132 people comprising 119 passengers, 11 crew, and 2 people on ground. Only 1 survivor.
 An F-16 TS-1604, crashed in Tulungagung on 15 June 1992, but the pilot ejected safely
An F-16 TS-1607, crashed at Halim Perdana Kusuma AB, on 10 March 1997, killing the pilot Cpt. Dwi Sasongko, who was with the "Elang Biru" acrobatic team, due to ejection seat failure.
A Hawk Mk 53 T-5311 piloted by Maj. Syahbudin Nur Hutasuhut and Cpt. Masrial and another Hawk T-5310 piloted by Cpt. Andis Solichin and Cpt. Weko Nartomo from the 15 Air Squadron crashed in a mid-air collision during an acrobatic exercise at the Iswahjudi Air Base on March 28, 2002. All four pilots were killed.
A Fokker F-27 A-2703 crashed on 6 April 2009, killing all 24 occupants comprising 6 crew, an instructor and 17 special forces trainees on board.
 A Lockheed L-100-30 Hercules, Model 382G-57C, A-1325, c/n 4917 crashed on 20 May 2009, killing at least 97 people and injuring 15 others, including some on the ground. The aircraft was carrying 98 passengers and 14 crew at the time and was travelling from Halim Perdanakusuma International Airport in Jakarta to West Papua via Sulawesi. Officials have stated that the plane crashed at about 6:30 a.m. around 5–7 kilometres from Iswahyudi Air Force Base. An official statement has not been released.
 A Fokker 27 A-2708 crashed on 21 June 2012, 10 people were killed, including all 7 crew on board the aircraft and 3 people on the ground. The aircraft crashed into a complex of military housing near Halim Perdanakusuma International Airport, and eight buildings were damaged or destroyed. The aircraft was conducting a routine training exercise.
 An F-16 TS-1643, was destroyed on 16 April 2015 when hydraulic brake failure caused the plane to catch fire and burnt the jet completely at Halim Perdana Kusuma AB. The pilot Lt. Col. Firman Dwi Cahyono escaped with burns.
An F-16 TS-1609 crashed on 24 June 2015 when its nose landing gear collapsed upon landing at Iswahyudi AB, Madiun, East Java.
On 30 June 2015, a Lockheed C-130B Hercules A-1310 crashed near a residential neighbourhood with 12 crew and 109 passengers on board shortly after taking off from Medan, killing all aboard, along with 22 people on the ground.
 20 December 2015: An Indonesian Airforce T-50i Golden Eagle fighter plane registered as TT-5007 had crashed in a flight demonstration during airshow in Adisutjipto Air Force Base in Yogyakarta, killing its two pilots, Lt. Col. Marda Sarjono and Cpt. Dwi Cahyadi.
 On 18 December 2016 a Lockheed C-130H A-1334 crashed while landing at Wamena Airport, killing all 13 passengers and crew aboard.
An F-16 TS-1603 skidded off the runway in during landing at the Roesmin Nurjadin Airbase, Pekanbaru, Sumatra on 14 March 2017 and slammed into the tarmac. The pilots, Maj. Andri Setiawan and 1st Lt. Marko Henderson, escaped injury.
 A Hawk 200 registered as TT-0209, crashed on 15 June 2020 around 5 kilometres from Roesmin Nurjadin Airbase, Pekanbaru. No casualties reported on this incident yet.
A KAI T-50i TT-5006 skidded off the runway during takeoff at Iswahyudi Airbase, Magetan, East Java on 10 August 2020. The aircraft were piloted by Maj. Luluk Teguh Prabowo as instructor and 2nd Lt. Muhammad Zacky as flight cadet, both of them were injured. The aircraft were heavily damaged as the result. The instructor pilot later died on 2 September 2020.
A KAI T-50i TT-5009 lost contact around Blora, Central Java on 18 July 2022. The aircraft was piloted by 1st Lt. Allan Safitra Indra Wahyudi, the flight was routine night exercise. Around 19:25 (+7 GMT) Local Time the aircraft lost contact around Blora, Madiun area and it was soon confirmed that the aircraft had crashed and the pilot had died in the accident.

See also
Indonesian Air Force Academy 
Indonesian Army
Indonesian Navy

References

Bibliography
 Aero-News Network. "Indonesian Air Force Grounds OV-10 Bronco Fleet" 25 July 2007
 Angkasa (Sky) magazine, Gramedia, Jakarta No. 7 Year XVII April 2008
 Crouch, Harold (2007) The Army and Politics in Indonesia, Equinox, Jakarta 
 Davies, Steve (2008) Red Eagles: America's Secret MiGs Osprey Publishing 
 Indonesian Embassy, Ottawa: US to help RI in repair/refurbishing 15 of 24 RI's C-130 transport

 Grodin, Yefim & Rigmat, Vladimir (2004) Tupelov Tu-16 Badger , Aerofax, London 
 Poerwoko, F. Djoko (2001) My Home My Base: Perjalanan Sejarah Pangkalan Udara Iswahjudi 1939–2000, Publisher – Iswahjudi Air Force Base, No ISBN
 Scramble Magazine. "Indonesian Air Arms Overview"
 Willis, David (Ed). Aerospace Encyclopedia of the World's Air Forces. Aerospace Publishing, London, 1999

Further reading
 Carlo Kopp, 'Indonesia's Air Capacity of Critical Concern to Australia,' Australian Aviation magazine, April 1993, pages 32–41

External links

 Official Website of TNI-AU (Air Force)
 Watch Su-30mk2 Indonesian Air Forces video from YouTube

 
Military units and formations established in 1946
Military of Indonesia